Anitsa Valkova (born 12 February 1968) is a Bulgarian sports shooter. She competed in the women's 10 metre air rifle event at the 1992 Summer Olympics.

References

1968 births
Living people
Bulgarian female sport shooters
Olympic shooters of Bulgaria
Shooters at the 1992 Summer Olympics
Sportspeople from Stara Zagora
20th-century Bulgarian women